Carlos Alberto Pavón Plummer (born 9 October 1973) is a Honduran former professional footballer who played as a striker. He is regarded as one of the best Honduran footballers in history, and by most as the nation's greatest player ever.

Most prominently affiliated with Real España, he has made over 200 appearances for Los Aurinegros in the Liga Nacional de Fútbol de Honduras, and is Honduras' all-time leading national team goalscorer.

Club career
Born in El Progreso, Yoro, to Blanca Nieves Pavón Macedo and Costa Rican footballer Allard Plummer, Pavón began his career at the age of 18 in his native Honduras with Real España on 30 May 1992 against Platense in the 1992 Honduran Cup, the final score was 1-1. While with Real España, Pavón won four Honduran league championships, as well as leading the league in scoring.

Mexican years
Pavón then played in Mexico for seven successive years, except for a short stint in Spain. He played for Morelia in the Mexican Primera División, winning the 2000 Clausura with the club. He has also played for Toluca, San Luis, Correcaminos, Necaxa, Cruz Azul, and Celaya, where he led the Mexican Second Division in scoring.

Europe
He has played in Italy in Serie A for both Udinese and Napoli from 2001 to 2003 and in Spain's first division with Real Valladolid (1995).

Major League Soccer
On 19 June 2007, he signed a deal to play for the Los Angeles Galaxy. 
He scored twice in the away match against New York Red Bulls on 18 August 2007, both coming from David Beckham assists. The match attracted 66,000 fans, the highest attendance ever recorded for a Bulls game. Pavón was waived at the end of the season.

Despite other offers from MLS teams, he went back to Real Club España in Honduras for 2008. After being released, he signed on with the struggling Club Necaxa of the Primera División de México. He made his debut for Necaxa on 1 March 2009 after only one training session with the club. He started the match and assisted both goals in their 2–2 draw with Club Santos Laguna.

After trying his luck at Club Necaxa he returned to Real España and retired after the 2012 Clausura to become assistant coach at the club as well as a football commentator.

Career statistics

International career
Pavón made his debut for Honduras in a July 1993 CONCACAF Gold Cup match against the USA and has earned a total of 101 caps, scoring a Honduran record 57 goals. He has represented his country in 37 FIFA World Cup qualification matches and played at the 2008 Summer Olympics and in only 1 game at the 2010 FIFA World Cup.

He also played at the 1995,1999, 2001 and 2009 UNCAF Nations Cups as well as at the 1993, 1998, 2000 and 2007 CONCACAF Gold Cups.

His final international was a June 2010 FIFA World Cup match against Chile. After participating in the World Cup through pain, it was discovered Pavón had a hernia. His future in football was in limbo, as a result of the injury.

International goals

Honours and awards

C.D. Real Espana
 Liga Profesional de Honduras: 1993–94, 2003–04 A, 2006–07 C, 2010–11 A
 Honduran Cup: 1992

Monarcas Morelia
 Liga MX: Invierno 2000

Honduras
 Copa Centroamericana: 1993, 1995

Individual
 Mexico Primera División A top scorer: Verano 1997 (shared with Ángel Lemus)
 Honduran Footballer of the Year: 2009
 IFFHS Most Popular Player Award: 2009
 CONCACAF Gold Cup Top Goalscorer: 2007
 CONCACAF Gold Cup All-Star Team: 2007
 Top goalscorers in Liga Nacional de Honduras: 2006–07 C
 All-time Top Scorer of Honduras National Football Team: 58 goals
 All-time Top Scorer of Real España: 72 goals

Personal life
He is the son of Costa Rican Allard Plummer, who played for Marathón in the 1970s and Blanca Nieves Pavón Macedo. He is married to Emy Diana James de Pavón and they have two sons, Carlos and André. His son Carlos Alberto Plummer James was enlisted by Real España in 2011.

Pavón also tried his luck on the music scene, but without major success. He was selected by UNICEF to for their campaign to prevent violence against women.

See also
List of men's footballers with 100 or more international caps

References

External links

 
 
 World Cup profile – FIFA
 
 

1973 births
Living people
People from Yoro Department
Association football forwards
Honduran footballers
Honduras international footballers
1993 CONCACAF Gold Cup players
1998 CONCACAF Gold Cup players
2000 CONCACAF Gold Cup players
2001 UNCAF Nations Cup players
2007 CONCACAF Gold Cup players
Footballers at the 2008 Summer Olympics
Olympic footballers of Honduras
2009 UNCAF Nations Cup players
2010 FIFA World Cup players
Real C.D. España players
Deportivo Toluca F.C. players
San Luis F.C. players
Real Valladolid players
Correcaminos UAT footballers
Club Necaxa footballers
Atlético Morelia players
Udinese Calcio players
S.S.C. Napoli players
Deportivo Cali footballers
Cruz Azul footballers
Comunicaciones F.C. players
LA Galaxy players
Honduran expatriate footballers
Honduran expatriate sportspeople in Mexico
Honduran expatriate sportspeople in Spain
Honduran expatriate sportspeople in Italy

Honduran expatriate sportspeople in Guatemala
Honduran expatriate sportspeople in the United States
Expatriate footballers in Mexico
Expatriate footballers in Spain
Expatriate footballers in Italy
Expatriate footballers in Colombia
Expatriate footballers in Guatemala
Expatriate soccer players in the United States
Liga Nacional de Fútbol Profesional de Honduras players
Liga MX players
La Liga players
Serie A players
Serie B players
Major League Soccer players
Categoría Primera A players
FIFA Century Club
Copa Centroamericana-winning players
Central American Games gold medalists for Honduras
Central American Games medalists in football